

Features overview

CPUs

APUs
APU features table

Initial platform (2003)
Launched in 2003, the initial platform for mobile AMD processors consists of:

Mobile Sempron

"Dublin" (Socket 754, CG, 130 nm, Desktop replacement)
MMX, SSE, SSE2, Enhanced 3DNow!, NX bit

"Dublin" (Socket 754, CG, 130 nm, Low power)
MMX, SSE, SSE2, Enhanced 3DNow!, NX bit

"Georgetown" (Socket 754, D0, 90 nm, Desktop replacement)
MMX, SSE, SSE2, Enhanced 3DNow!, NX bit

"Sonora" (Socket 754, D0, 90 nm, Low power)
MMX, SSE, SSE2, Enhanced 3DNow!, NX bit

"Albany" (Socket 754, E6, 90 nm, Desktop replacement)
MMX, SSE, SSE2, SSE3, Enhanced 3DNow!, NX bit

"Roma" (Socket 754, E6, 90 nm, Low power)
MMX, SSE, SSE2, SSE3, Enhanced 3DNow!, NX bit

Mobile Athlon 64

"ClawHammer" (C0 & CG, 130 nm, Desktop replacement)
MMX, SSE, SSE2, Enhanced 3DNow!, NX bit, AMD64 (AMD's x86-64 implementation), PowerNow!

"ClawHammer" (C0 & CG, 130 nm, 62 W TDP)
MMX, SSE, SSE2, Enhanced 3DNow!, NX bit, AMD64 (AMD's x86-64 implementation), PowerNow!

"ClawHammer" (CG, 130 nm, 35 W TDP)
MMX, SSE, SSE2, Enhanced 3DNow!, NX bit, AMD64 (AMD's x86-64 implementation), PowerNow!

"Odessa" (CG, 130 nm, Desktop replacement)
MMX, SSE, SSE2, Enhanced 3DNow!, NX bit, AMD64 (AMD's x86-64 implementation), PowerNow!

"Odessa" (CG, 130 nm, 35 W TDP)
MMX, SSE, SSE2, Enhanced 3DNow!, NX bit, AMD64 (AMD's x86-64 implementation), PowerNow!

"Oakville" (D0, 90 nm, 35 W TDP Low Power)
MMX, SSE, SSE2, Enhanced 3DNow!, NX bit, AMD64 (AMD's x86-64 implementation), PowerNow!

"Newark" (E5, 90 nm, 62 W TDP)
MMX, SSE, SSE2, SSE3, Enhanced 3DNow!, NX bit, AMD64 (AMD's x86-64 implementation), PowerNow!

Turion 64

"Lancaster" (90 nm)
MMX, SSE, SSE2, SSE3, Enhanced 3DNow!, NX bit, AMD64, PowerNow!

Kite platform (2006)
Introduced in 2006, the Kite platform consists of:

 Mobile Sempron 
"Keene" (Socket S1, F2, 90 nm, Low power)
MMX, SSE, SSE2, SSE3, Enhanced 3DNow!, NX bit, AMD64, PowerNow!

 Turion 64 
"Richmond" (90 nm)
MMX, SSE, SSE2, SSE3, Enhanced 3DNow!, NX bit, AMD64, PowerNow!, AMD-V

Turion 64 X2
"Taylor" (90 nm)
MMX, SSE, SSE2, SSE3, Enhanced 3DNow!, NX bit, AMD64, PowerNow!, AMD-V

"Trinidad" (90 nm)
MMX, SSE, SSE2, SSE3, Enhanced 3DNow!, NX bit, AMD64, PowerNow!, AMD-V

Kite Refresh platform (2007)
AMD used Kite Refresh as the codenamed for the second-generation AMD mobile platform introduced in February 2007.

Mobile Sempron

"Sherman" (Socket S1, G1 & G2, 65 nm, Low power)
MMX, SSE, SSE2, SSE3, Enhanced 3DNow!, NX bit, AMD64

Athlon 64 X2

"Tyler" (65 nm)
MMX, SSE, SSE2, SSE3, Enhanced 3DNow!, NX bit, AMD64, PowerNow!, AMD-V

Turion 64 X2

"Tyler" (65 nm)
MMX, SSE, SSE2, SSE3, Enhanced 3DNow!, NX bit, AMD64, PowerNow!, AMD-V

Puma platform (2008)
The Puma platform introduced in 2008 with June 2008 availability for the third-generation AMD mobile platform consists of:

Mobile Sempron

"Sable" (65 nm)
MMX, SSE, SSE2, SSE3, Enhanced 3DNow!, NX bit, AMD64, PowerNow!

Athlon X2

"Lion" (65 nm)
MMX, SSE, SSE2, SSE3, Enhanced 3DNow!, NX bit, AMD64, PowerNow!, AMD-V

Turion X2

"Lion" (65 nm)
MMX, SSE, SSE2, SSE3, Enhanced 3DNow!, NX bit, AMD64, PowerNow!, AMD-V

Turion X2 Ultra

"Lion" (65 nm)
MMX, SSE, SSE2, SSE3, Enhanced 3DNow!, NX bit, AMD64, PowerNow!, AMD-V

Yukon platform (2009)
The Yukon platform was introduced on January 8, 2009 with expected April availability for the first AMD Ultrathin Platform targeting the ultra-portable notebook market.

Sempron

"Huron" (65 nm, Low power)
 Both models support: MMX, SSE, SSE2, SSE3, Enhanced 3DNow!, NX bit, AMD64
 Sempron 210U supports extra AMD-V

Athlon Neo

"Huron" (65 nm, 15 W TDP)
MMX, SSE, SSE2, SSE3, Enhanced 3DNow!, NX bit, AMD64 (AMD's x86-64 implementation), PowerNow!, AMD-V

"Sherman" (65 nm, 15 W TDP)
MMX, SSE, SSE2, SSE3, Enhanced 3DNow!, NX bit, AMD64 (AMD's x86-64 implementation), PowerNow!

"Congo" (65 nm, 13 W TDP)
MMX, SSE, SSE2, SSE3, Enhanced 3DNow!, NX bit, AMD64 (AMD's x86-64 implementation), PowerNow!

Turion

"Congo" (65 nm, 20 W TDP)
MMX, SSE, SSE2, SSE3, Enhanced 3DNow!, NX bit, AMD64 (AMD's x86-64 implementation), PowerNow!

Congo platform (2009)
The Congo platform  was introduced in September 2009, as the second AMD Ultrathin Platform targeting the ultra-portable notebook market.

Athlon Neo X2

"Conesus" (65 nm)
MMX, SSE, SSE2, SSE3, Enhanced 3DNow!, NX bit, AMD64, AMD-V

Turion Neo X2

"Conesus" (65 nm)
MMX, SSE, SSE2, SSE3, Enhanced 3DNow!, NX bit, AMD64, AMD-V, PowerNow!

Tigris platform (2009)
The Tigris platform  introduced in September 2009 for the AMD Mainstream Notebook Platform consists of:

Sempron

"Caspian" (45 nm)
Single-core mobile processor

MMX, SSE, SSE2, SSE3, SSE4a, ABM, Enhanced 3DNow!, NX bit, AMD64, PowerNow!, AMD-V

Athlon II

"Caspian" (45 nm)
Dual-core mobile processor

MMX, SSE, SSE2, SSE3, SSE4a, ABM, Enhanced 3DNow!, NX bit, AMD64, PowerNow!, AMD-V

Turion II

"Caspian" (45 nm)
Dual-core mobile processor

MMX, SSE, SSE2, SSE3, SSE4a, ABM, Enhanced 3DNow!, NX bit, AMD64, PowerNow!, AMD-V

Turion II (Ultra)

"Caspian" (45 nm)
Dual-core mobile processor

MMX, SSE, SSE2, SSE3, SSE4a, ABM, Enhanced 3DNow!, NX bit, AMD64, PowerNow!, AMD-V

Nile platform (2010)
The Nile platform  introduced on May 12, 2010 for the third AMD Ultrathin Platform consists of:

 MMX, SSE, SSE2, SSE3, SSE4a, ABM, Enhanced 3DNow!, NX bit, AMD64, PowerNow!, AMD-V
 Memory support: DDR3 SDRAM, DDR3L SDRAM (Up to 1066)

V series

"Geneva" (45 nm)
Single-core mobile processor

Athlon II Neo

"Geneva" (45 nm)
Single-core mobile processor
Single-core mobile processor

Dual-core mobile processor

Turion II Neo

"Geneva" (45 nm)
Dual-core mobile processor

Danube platform (2010)
The Danube platform introduced on May 12, 2010 for the AMD Mainstream Notebook Platform consists of:

 MMX, SSE, SSE2, SSE3, SSE4a, ABM, Enhanced 3DNow!, NX bit, AMD64, PowerNow!, AMD-V
 Memory support: DDR3 SDRAM, DDR3L SDRAM (Up to 1066 MHz)

V series

Champlain (45 nm) 
Single-core mobile processor

Athlon II

Champlain (45 nm) 
Dual-core mobile processor

Turion II

Champlain (45 nm) 
Dual-core mobile processor

Phenom II 
 MMX, SSE, SSE2, SSE3, SSE4a, ABM, Enhanced 3DNow!, NX bit, AMD64, PowerNow!, AMD-V
 Unlike desktop models, mobile Phenom II-based models do not have L3 cache
 Memory support: DDR3 SDRAM, DDR3L SDRAM (Up to 1333 MHz)

Champlain (45 nm) 
Dual-core mobile processor

 Triple-core mobile processors 

 Quad-core mobile processors

Brazos platform (2011)
AMD Ultrathin Platform introduced on January 5, 2011, as the fourth AMD mobile platform targeting the ultra-portable notebook market. It features the 40 nm AMD Ontario (a 9-watt AMD APU for netbooks and small form factor desktops and devices) and Zacate (an 18-watt TDP APU for ultrathin, mainstream, and value notebooks as well as desktops and all-in-ones) APUs.
Both low-power APU versions feature two Bobcat x86 cores and fully support DirectX11, DirectCompute (Microsoft programming interface for GPU computing) and OpenCL (cross-platform programming interface standard for multi-core x86 and accelerated GPU computing). Both also include UVD dedicated hardware acceleration for HD video including 1080p resolutions. This platform consists of:

"Ontario" (40 nm)
 SSE, SSE2, SSE3, SSSE3, SSE4a, ABM, NX bit, AMD64, PowerNow!, AMD-V
 Memory support: DDR3 SDRAM, DDR3L SDRAM (Single-channel, up to 1066 MHz)
 2.5 GT/s UMI.
 Config GPU are Unified shaders : Texture mapping units : Render output units
 Socket FT1 (BGA-413)

"Zacate" (40 nm)
 SSE, SSE2, SSE3, SSSE3, SSE4a, ABM, NX bit, AMD64, PowerNow!, AMD-V
 Memory support: DDR3 SDRAM, DDR3L SDRAM (Single-channel, up to 1066 MHz)
 2.5 GT/s UMI.
 Config GPU are Unified shaders : Texture mapping units : Render output units
 Socket FT1 (BGA-413)

Sabine (Fusion) platform (2011)
The Sabine platform introduced on June 30, 2011 for the AMD Mainstream Notebook Platform consists of:

"Llano" (32 nm)
 SSE, SSE2, SSE3, SSE4a, ABM, Enhanced 3DNow!, NX bit, AMD64, PowerNow!, AMD-V, Turbo Core
 Memory support: 1.35 V DDR3L-1333 memory, in addition to regular 1.5 V DDR3 memory specified (Dual-channel)
 2.5 GT/s UMI.
 Transistors: 1.148 billion
 Die size: 228 mm²

1 Unified shaders : Texture mapping units : Render output units

Brazos 2.0 platform (2012)
AMD Ultrathin Platform introduced on June 6, 2012, as the fourth AMD mobile platform targeting the ultra-portable notebook market. It will feature the 40 nm Zacate (an 18-watt TDP APU for ultrathin, mainstream, and value notebooks as well as desktops and all-in-ones) APUs.
This platform consists of:

"Ontario", "Zacate" (40 nm)
 SSE, SSE2, SSE3, SSSE3, SSE4a, ABM, NX bit, AMD64, PowerNow!, AMD-V
 Single-channel DDR3 SDRAM, DDR3L SDRAM
 2.5 GT/s UMI.
 Config GPU are Unified shaders : Texture mapping units : Render output units
 Socket FT1 (BGA-413)

Comal (Fusion) platform (2012)
The Comal platform introduced on May 15, 2012 for the AMD Mainstream Notebook Platform consists of:

"Trinity" (2012, 32 nm)
 MMX, SSE, SSE2, SSE3, SSSE3, SSE4.1, SSE4.2, SSE4a, NX bit, AMD64, AMD-V, AES, CLMUL, AVX, AVX 1.1, XOP, FMA3, FMA4, CVT16, F16C, Turbo Core
 Memory support: 1.35 V DDR3L-1600 memory, in addition to regular 1.5 V DDR3 memory specified (Dual-channel)
 2.5 GT/s UMI.
 Transistors: 1.303 billion
 Die size: 246 mm²

1 Config GPU are Unified shaders : Texture mapping units : Render output units

"Richland" (2013, 32 nm)
 Elite Performance APU.
 MMX, SSE, SSE2, SSE3, SSSE3, SSE4.1, SSE4.2, SSE4a, NX bit, AMD64, AMD-V, AES, CLMUL, AVX, AVX 1.1, XOP, FMA3, FMA4, CVT16, F16C, Turbo Core
 Memory support: 1.35 V DDR3L-1600 memory, in addition to regular 1.5 V DDR3 memory specified (Dual-channel)
 2.5 GT/s UMI.
 Transistors: 1.303 billion
 Die size: 246 mm²

1 Config GPU are Unified shaders : Texture mapping units : Render output units

Jaguar (2013)

"Temash" (2013, 28 nm)
Elite Mobility APU:

1 Unified shaders : Texture mapping units : Render output units

"Kabini" (2013, 28 nm)
Mainstream APU:

1 Unified shaders : Texture mapping units : Render output units

Puma (2014)

Mullins, Tablet/2-in-1 APU

Beema, Notebook APU

Kaveri (2014)

Carrizo-L (2015)

Carrizo (2015)

Bristol Ridge (2016)

"Raven Ridge" (2017)

"Picasso" (2019)

"Renoir" (2020)

U

H

"Lucienne" (2021)

"Cezanne" (2021)

U

H

"Barceló" (2022)

"Rembrandt" (2022)

Rembrandt-R (7035 series)(2023)

Phoenix (7040 series)(2023)

Dragon Range (7045 series)(2023)

See also
 List of AMD microprocessors
 List of AMD processors with 3D graphics

References

External links
 AMD Platforms for Notebook PCs
 Compare AMD Notebook Processors
 Technical specification AMD products
 AMD products and technologies
 CPU Informations

AMD Phenom
Phenom